Fibroblast growth factor receptor-like 1 is a protein that in humans is encoded by the FGFRL1 gene.

The protein encoded by this gene is a member of the fibroblast growth factor receptor (FGFR) family, where amino acid sequence is highly conserved between members and throughout evolution. FGFR family members differ from one another in their ligand affinities and tissue distribution. A full-length representative protein would consist of an extracellular region, composed of three immunoglobulin-like domains, a single hydrophobic membrane-spanning segment and a cytoplasmic tyrosine kinase domain. The extracellular portion of the protein interacts with fibroblast growth factors, setting in motion a cascade of downstream signals, ultimately influencing mitogenesis and differentiation. A marked difference between this gene product and the other family members is its lack of a cytoplasmic tyrosine kinase domain. The result is a transmembrane receptor that could interact with other family members and potentially inhibit signaling. Multiple alternatively spliced transcript variants encoding the same isoform have been found for this gene.

References

Further reading